Old Mill School may refer to:
Old Mill School (Mill Valley, California)
Old Mill School, a public school in Sea Girt, New Jersey
Old Mill High School, a public high school in Millersville, Maryland

See also
Old Mill (disambiguation)